Alina Metkalov (or Matkelov, ; born 17 March 1998) is an Israeli footballer who plays as a midfielder and has appeared for the Israel women's national team.

Career
Metkalov has been capped for the Israel national team, appearing for the team during the 2019 FIFA Women's World Cup qualifying cycle.

References

External links
 
 
 

1998 births
Living people
Israeli women's footballers
Israel women's international footballers
Women's association football midfielders
Footballers from Beersheba
Ukrainian emigrants to Israel